The Reformists Coalition was the sole reformists electoral alliance for the 2006 municipal election of Tehran.

28 parties and organizations were part of the coalition, including the members of the Council for Coordinating the Reforms Front and National Trust Party.

The coalition won four seats.

Candidates

References 

Electoral lists for Iranian elections
Reformist political groups in Iran